Musiri taluk is a taluk of Tiruchirapalli district of the Indian state of Tamil Nadu. The headquarters of the taluk is the town of Musiri.

Demographics
According to the 2011 census, the taluk of Musiri had a population of 226,372 (113,033 males and 113,339 females); there were 1,003 women for every 1,000 men. The taluk had a literacy rate of 69.68%. Child population in the age group below 6 was 11,336 males and 10,488 females. Among the total population, 157,739 people are literates.

References 

 

Taluks of Tiruchirapalli district